"One More Time" is a song by British singer Craig David. It was released as a digital download on 20 May 2016 as the third single from his sixth studio album, Following My Intuition. This is the third single for his comeback, after "When the Bassline Drops" and "Nothing Like This", which received acclaim from critics.

Chart performance
The song peaked number 30 on the UK Singles Chart on 27 May 2016, and remained in the top 100 for 10 weeks before dropping out.

Music video
A music video for the song was released through David's official Facebook account on 27 May 2016 and features him as a DJ, with amount of friends dancing around his turntable throughout the song.

Track listing

Charts

Release history

References

2016 songs
2016 singles
Songs written by Craig David
Craig David songs
UK garage songs
Songs written by Tre Jean-Marie